Aimee Bruder (born August 3, 1974, in Cincinnati, Ohio) is an American Paralympic swimmer.

She won three bronze medals at 1996 Summer Paralympics for 100 m, 200 m and 4x50 freestyle swimming. Four years later she won a silver medal in the Sydney Paralympic Games for 4x50 freestyle and eight years later she was awarded another bronze medal at the 2008 Summer Paralympics in Beijing, China for another 100 metre freestyle swim. In March 2002 she received two silver medals for 4x50 freestyle and medley swimming at the IPC Swimming World Championships in Mar del Plata.

References

External links 
 
 

1974 births
Living people
American female freestyle swimmers
Paralympic swimmers of the United States
Paralympic bronze medalists for the United States
Paralympic silver medalists for the United States
Swimmers at the 1996 Summer Paralympics
Swimmers at the 2000 Summer Paralympics
Swimmers at the 2008 Summer Paralympics
Medalists at the 1996 Summer Paralympics
Medalists at the 2000 Summer Paralympics
Medalists at the 2008 Summer Paralympics
Swimmers from Cincinnati
S4-classified Paralympic swimmers
Paralympic medalists in swimming
21st-century American women
American female medley swimmers